In numerical analysis, the Runge–Kutta methods are a family of implicit and explicit iterative methods, which include the Euler method, used in temporal discretization for the approximate solutions of simultaneous nonlinear equations. These methods were developed around 1900 by the German mathematicians Carl Runge and Wilhelm Kutta.

The Runge–Kutta method

The most widely known member of the Runge–Kutta family is generally referred to as "RK4", the "classic Runge–Kutta method" or simply as "the Runge–Kutta method".

Let an initial value problem be specified as follows:

The function  and the initial conditions ,   are given.

Now we pick a step-size h > 0 and define:

for n = 0, 1, 2, 3, ..., using

(Note: the above equations have different but equivalent definitions in different texts).

  is the slope at the beginning of the interval, using  (Euler's method);

In averaging the four slopes, greater weight is given to the slopes at the midpoint.

Explicit Runge–Kutta methods
The family of explicit Runge–Kutta methods is a generalization of the RK4 method mentioned above. It is given by

where

(Note: the above equations may have different but equivalent definitions in some texts).

To specify a particular method, one needs to provide the integer s (the number of stages), and the coefficients aij (for 1 ≤ j < i ≤ s), bi (for i = 1, 2, ..., s) and ci (for i = 2, 3, ..., s). The matrix [aij] is called the Runge–Kutta matrix, while the bi and ci are known as the weights and the nodes. These data are usually arranged in a mnemonic device, known as a Butcher tableau (after John C. Butcher):

{| style="text-align: center" cellspacing="0" cellpadding="3"
| style="border-right:1px solid;" | 
|-
| style="border-right:1px solid;" |  || 
|-
| style="border-right:1px solid;" |  ||  || 
|-
| style="border-right:1px solid;" |  ||  || || 
|-
| style="border-right:1px solid; border-bottom:1px solid;" | 
| style="border-bottom:1px solid;" | 
| style="border-bottom:1px solid;" | 
| style="border-bottom:1px solid;" | 
| style="border-bottom:1px solid;" |  || style="border-bottom:1px solid;" |
|-
| style="border-right:1px solid;" | ||  ||  ||  ||  || 
|}

A Taylor series expansion shows that the Runge–Kutta method is consistent if and only if

There are also accompanying requirements if one requires the method to have a certain order p, meaning that the local truncation error is O(hp+1). These can be derived from the definition of the truncation error itself. For example, a two-stage method has order 2 if b1 + b2 = 1, b2c2 = 1/2, and b2a21 = 1/2. Note that a popular condition for determining coefficients is 

This condition alone, however, is neither sufficient, nor necessary for consistency.

In general, if an explicit -stage Runge–Kutta method has order , then it can be proven that the number of stages must satisfy , and if , then .
However, it is not known whether these bounds are sharp in all cases; for example, all known methods of order 8 have at least 11 stages, though it is possible that there are methods with fewer stages. (The bound above suggests that there could be a method with 9 stages; but it could also be that the bound is simply not sharp.) Indeed, it is an open problem
what the precise minimum number of stages  is for an explicit Runge–Kutta method to have order  in those cases where no methods have yet been discovered that satisfy the bounds above with equality. Some values which are known are:

The provable bounds above then imply that we can not find methods of orders  that require fewer stages than the methods we already know for these orders. However, it is conceivable that we might find a method of order  that has only 8 stages, whereas the only ones known today have at least 9 stages as shown in the table.

Examples
The RK4 method falls in this framework. Its tableau is

{| style="text-align: center" cellspacing="0" cellpadding="3"
| style="border-right:1px solid;" | 0
|-
| style="border-right:1px solid;" | 1/2 || 1/2
|-
| style="border-right:1px solid;" | 1/2 || 0 || 1/2
|-
| style="border-right:1px solid; border-bottom:1px solid;" | 1 || style="border-bottom:1px solid;" | 0
| style="border-bottom:1px solid;" | 0 || style="border-bottom:1px solid;" | 1
| style="border-bottom:1px solid;" |
|-
| style="border-right:1px solid;" | || 1/6 || 1/3 || 1/3 || 1/6
|}

A slight variation of "the" Runge–Kutta method is also due to Kutta in 1901 and is called the 3/8-rule. The primary advantage this method has is that almost all of the error coefficients are smaller than in the popular method, but it requires slightly more FLOPs (floating-point operations) per time step. Its Butcher tableau is

{| style="text-align: center" cellspacing="0" cellpadding="3"
| style="border-right:1px solid;" | 0
|-
| style="border-right:1px solid;" | 1/3 || 1/3
|-
| style="border-right:1px solid;" | 2/3 || -1/3 || 1
|-
| style="border-right:1px solid; border-bottom:1px solid;" | 1 || style="border-bottom:1px solid;" | 1
| style="border-bottom:1px solid;" | −1 || style="border-bottom:1px solid;" | 1
| style="border-bottom:1px solid;" |
|-
| style="border-right:1px solid;" | || 1/8 || 3/8 || 3/8 || 1/8
|}

However, the simplest Runge–Kutta method is the (forward) Euler method, given by the formula . This is the only consistent explicit Runge–Kutta method with one stage. The corresponding tableau is

{| style="text-align: center" cellspacing="0" cellpadding="3"
| width="10" style="border-right:1px solid; border-bottom:1px solid;" | 0
| width="10" style="border-bottom:1px solid;" |
|-
| style="border-right:1px solid;" | || 1
|}

Second-order methods with two stages
An example of a second-order method with two stages is provided by the midpoint method:

The corresponding tableau is

{| style="text-align: center" cellspacing="0" cellpadding="3"
| style="border-right:1px solid;" | 0
|-
| style="border-right:1px solid; border-bottom:1px solid;" | 1/2 || style="border-bottom:1px solid;" | 1/2 || style="border-bottom:1px solid;" |
|-
| style="border-right:1px solid;" | || 0 || 1
|}

The midpoint method is not the only second-order Runge–Kutta method with two stages; there is a family of such methods, parameterized by α and given by the formula

Its Butcher tableau is

{| style="text-align: center" cellspacing="0" cellpadding="8"
| style="border-right:1px solid;" | 0
|-
| style="border-right:1px solid; border-bottom:1px solid;" |  || style="border-bottom:1px solid; text-align: center;" |  || style="border-bottom:1px solid;" |
|-
| style="border-right:1px solid;" | ||  || 
|}

Use
As an example, consider the two-stage second-order Runge–Kutta method with α = 2/3, also known as Ralston method. It is given by the tableau

with the corresponding equations

This method is used to solve the initial-value problem

with step size h = 0.025, so the method needs to take four steps.

The method proceeds as follows:

The numerical solutions correspond to the underlined values.

Adaptive Runge–Kutta methods
Adaptive methods are designed to produce an estimate of the local truncation error of a single Runge–Kutta step. This is done by having two methods, one with order  and one with order . These methods are interwoven, i.e., they have common intermediate steps. Thanks to this, estimating the error has little or negligible computational cost compared to a step with the higher-order method.

During the integration, the step size is adapted such that the estimated error stays below a user-defined threshold: If the error is too high, a step is repeated with a lower step size; if the error is much smaller, the step size is increased to save time. This results in an (almost) optimal step size, which saves computation time. Moreover, the user does not have to spend time on finding an appropriate step size.

The lower-order step is given by

where  are the same as for the higher-order method. Then the error is

The Butcher tableau for this kind of method is extended to give the values of :

The Runge–Kutta–Fehlberg method has two methods of orders 5 and 4. Its extended Butcher tableau is:

However, the simplest adaptive Runge–Kutta method involves combining Heun's method, which is order 2, with the Euler method, which is order 1. Its extended Butcher tableau is:

Other adaptive Runge–Kutta methods are the Bogacki–Shampine method (orders 3 and 2), the Cash–Karp method and the Dormand–Prince method (both with orders 5 and 4).

Nonconfluent Runge–Kutta methods

Runge–Kutta–Nyström methods

Runge–Kutta–Nyström methods are specialized Runge-Kutta methods that are optimized for second-order differential equations of the following form:

Implicit Runge–Kutta methods
All Runge–Kutta methods mentioned up to now are explicit methods. Explicit Runge–Kutta methods are generally unsuitable for the solution of stiff equations because their region of absolute stability is small; in particular, it is bounded.
This issue is especially important in the solution of partial differential equations.

The instability of explicit Runge–Kutta methods motivates the development of implicit methods. An implicit Runge–Kutta method has the form

where
 

The difference with an explicit method is that in an explicit method, the sum over j only goes up to i − 1. This also shows up in the Butcher tableau: the coefficient matrix  of an explicit method is lower triangular. In an implicit method, the sum over j goes up to s and the coefficient matrix is not triangular, yielding a Butcher tableau of the form

See Adaptive Runge-Kutta methods above for the explanation of the  row.

The consequence of this difference is that at every step, a system of algebraic equations has to be solved. This increases the computational cost considerably. If a method with s stages is used to solve a differential equation with m components, then the system of algebraic equations has ms components. This can be contrasted with implicit linear multistep methods (the other big family of methods for ODEs): an implicit s-step linear multistep method needs to solve a system of algebraic equations with only m components, so the size of the system does not increase as the number of steps increases.

Examples
The simplest example of an implicit Runge–Kutta method is the backward Euler method:

The Butcher tableau for this is simply:

This Butcher tableau corresponds to the formulae

which can be re-arranged to get the formula for the backward Euler method listed above.

Another example for an implicit Runge–Kutta method is the trapezoidal rule. Its Butcher tableau is:

The trapezoidal rule is a collocation method (as discussed in that article). All collocation methods are implicit Runge–Kutta methods, but not all implicit Runge–Kutta methods are collocation methods.

The Gauss–Legendre methods form a family of collocation methods based on Gauss quadrature. A Gauss–Legendre method with s stages has order 2s (thus, methods with arbitrarily high order can be constructed). The method with two stages (and thus order four) has Butcher tableau:

Stability
The advantage of implicit Runge–Kutta methods over explicit ones is their greater stability, especially when applied to stiff equations. Consider the linear test equation . A Runge–Kutta method applied to this equation reduces to the iteration , with r given by

 

where e stands for the vector of ones. The function r is called the stability function. It follows from the formula that r is the quotient of two polynomials of degree s if the method has s stages. Explicit methods have a strictly lower triangular matrix A, which implies that det(I − zA) = 1 and that the stability function is a polynomial.

The numerical solution to the linear test equation decays to zero if | r(z) | < 1 with z = hλ. The set of such z is called the domain of absolute stability. In particular, the method is said to be absolute stable if all z with Re(z) < 0 are in the domain of absolute stability. The stability function of an explicit Runge–Kutta method is a polynomial, so explicit Runge–Kutta methods can never be A-stable.

Thus, it is of interest to study quotients of polynomials of given degrees that approximate the exponential function the best. These are known as Padé approximants. A Padé approximant with numerator of degree m and denominator of degree n is A-stable if and only if m ≤ n ≤ m + 2.

The Gauss–Legendre method with s stages has order 2s, so its stability function is the Padé approximant with m = n = s. It follows that the method is A-stable. This shows that A-stable Runge–Kutta can have arbitrarily high order. In contrast, the order of A-stable linear multistep methods cannot exceed two.

B-stability
The A-stability concept for the solution of differential equations is related to the linear autonomous equation . Dahlquist proposed the investigation of stability of numerical schemes when applied to nonlinear systems that satisfy a monotonicity condition. The corresponding concepts were defined as G-stability for multistep methods (and the related one-leg methods) and B-stability (Butcher, 1975) for Runge–Kutta methods. A Runge–Kutta method applied to the non-linear system , which verifies , is called B-stable, if this condition implies  for two numerical solutions.

Derivation of the Runge–Kutta fourth-order method
In general a Runge–Kutta method of order  can be written as:

where:

We develop the derivation for the Runge–Kutta fourth-order method using the general formula with  evaluated, as explained above, at the starting point, the midpoint and the end point of any interval ; thus, we choose:

 

and  otherwise. We begin by defining the following quantities:

If we define:

and for the previous relations we can show that the following equalities hold up to :
where:

If we now express the general formula using what we just derived we obtain:

and comparing this with the Taylor series of  around :

we obtain a system of constraints on the coefficients:

which when solved gives  as stated above.

See also
 Euler's method
 List of Runge–Kutta methods
 Numerical methods for ordinary differential equations
 Runge–Kutta method (SDE)
 General linear methods
 Lie group integrator

Notes

References
 .
 .
 .
 .
 .
 
 .
 .
 .
 .
 .
  (see Chapter 6).
 .
 .
 .
 
 .
 . Also, Section 17.2. Adaptive Stepsize Control for Runge-Kutta.
 .
 .
 .
 advance discrete maths ignou reference book (code- mcs033)
 John C. Butcher: "B-Series : Algebraic Analysis of Numerical Methods", Springer（SSCM, volume 55),  (April, 2021).

External links
 
 Runge–Kutta 4th-Order Method
 Tracker Component Library Implementation in Matlab — Implements 32 embedded Runge Kutta algorithms in RungeKStep, 24 embedded Runge-Kutta Nyström algorithms in RungeKNystroemSStep and 4 general Runge-Kutta Nyström algorithms in RungeKNystroemGStep.

 
Numerical differential equations
Numerical analysis